Levarchal (also Romanized as Levarchāl) is a village in Birun Bashm Rural District, Kelardasht District, Chalus County, Mazandaran Province, Iran. At the 2006 census, its population was 23, in 9 families.

References 

Populated places in Chalus County